Stanley Dunbar Embick (January 22, 1877 – October 23, 1957) was a lieutenant general in the United States Army.

Military career

Embick was born in Greencastle, Franklin County, Pennsylvania on January 22, 1877. He attended Dickinson College before enrolling at the United States Military Academy in West Point, New York, from which he graduated in 1899. Commissioned a second lieutenant of Artillery, he served in the occupation of Cuba following the Spanish–American War. After his service in Cuba, he served in a variety of assignments, including the staff of the Coast Artillery School at Fort Monroe, Virginia and Assistant to the Chief of Artillery in Washington, D.C.

During World War I Embick served on the staff of the Supreme War Council, and then the Commission to Negotiate Peace, for which he received the Army Distinguished Service Medal. The citation for the medal reads:

In December 1919 Embick was assigned to the staff of the War Department's War Plans Division, where he served until attending the Army War College. After serving as a War College instructor, Embick served in the Philippines, afterwards returning to Washington to serve as Executive Officer of the War Plans Division. In 1930 he became commandant of the Coast Artillery School.

In 1932 Embick was appointed commander of harbor defenses in the Philippines as a brigadier general, where he was responsible for constructing Corregidor's Malinta Tunnel, which was used as a bomb-proof storage and personnel bunker and hospital during World War II, and is now the venue for a historical audio-visual presentation about the war.

Embick became Director of the War Plans Division as a major general in 1936, and later that year was named the Army's Deputy Chief of Staff. He was appointed IV Corps commander in 1938, and later the same year took command of the Third Army as a lieutenant general, where he served until his 1941 retirement.

Embick was recalled for World War II, serving as Chief of the Joint Strategic Survey Committee, Chairman of the Inter-American Defense Board, and a delegate to the Dumbarton Oaks Conference that created the United Nations. He retired again in 1946, receiving a second Distinguished Service Medal.

Later life
In the late 1940s Embick served on the commission that proposed reforms to America's military and intelligence agencies, including creation of the Department of Defense by merging the War and Navy Departments.

Embick died at Washington, D.C.'s Walter Reed Army Hospital on October 23, 1957, and was buried at Arlington National Cemetery. He was the father in law of General Albert Coady Wedemeyer.

Awards
Army Distinguished Service Medal with oak leaf cluster
Army of Cuban Occupation Medal
World War I Victory Medal
American Defense Service Medal
American Campaign Medal
World War II Victory Medal

Dates of rank

References

Bibliography
 Biographical Annals of Cumberland County, Pennsylvania, Chicago: The Genealogical Publishing Co., 1905, pages 141–143
 General Stanley D. Embick: Military Dissenter, Society for Military History, by Ronald Schaffer, 1973
 Men of West Point: The First 150 Years of the United States Military Academy, by Richard Ernest Dupuy, 1951
 Biographical Register of the Officers and Graduates of the U.S. Military Academy at West Point, New York Since its Establishment in 1802, by George Washington Cullum, 1920, Supplemental Volume VI-A, page 873
 Corregidor in Peace and War, by Charles M. Hubbard and Collis H. Davis, 2007
 Dominion or Decline: Anglo-American Naval Relations on the Pacific, 1937–1941, by Ian Cowman, 1996
 Dumbarton Oaks: The Origins of the United Nations and the Search for Postwar Security, by Robert C. Hilderbrand, 1990
 The National Cyclopaedia of American biography, by James Terry White, 1967, Volume 43, page 102

External links
Generals of World War II
 Military Times, Awards and Citations
 United States Army in World War II, by Mark Skinner Watson, Published by US War Department, 1950, Chapter 3
 HistoryNet.com. "Louisiana Maneuvers, (1940–41)", by Mark Perry
 , Time, Monday, June 4, 1945

1877 births
1957 deaths
Recipients of the Distinguished Service Medal (US Army)
Burials at Arlington National Cemetery
United States Army personnel of World War I
United States Army generals of World War II
United States Army generals
American military personnel of the Spanish–American War
United States Military Academy alumni
United States Army War College alumni
People from Franklin County, Pennsylvania
Military personnel from Pennsylvania